George Pugh is a former American football player and coach. He served as the head football coach at Alabama A&M University from 1989 to 1991, compiling a record of 17–12. Pugh most recently served as the director of player personnel at the University of Memphis.

Head coaching record

College

Notes

References

Year of birth missing (living people)
Living people
American football tight ends
Alabama Crimson Tide football players
Alabama A&M Bulldogs football coaches
Arkansas Razorbacks football coaches
Chattanooga Mocs football coaches
Georgia State Panthers football coaches
Houston Cougars football coaches
New Mexico Lobos football coaches
Pittsburgh Panthers football coaches
Texas A&M Aggies football coaches
UAB Blazers football coaches
High school football coaches in Georgia (U.S. state)
African-American coaches of American football
African-American players of American football
20th-century African-American sportspeople
21st-century African-American sportspeople